André Gailhard (29 June 1885 – 3 July 1966) was a French classical music composer.

Biography 
André Gailhard, full name André Charles Samson Gailhard, was the son of Pierre Gailhard, once the director of the Paris Opera. He studied at the Conservatoire de Paris with Paul Vidal, Xavier Leroux and Charles Lenepveu. In 1908 he won the prix de Rome for composition. He directed the Théâtre Fémina in Paris.

Works 
Gailhard composed several operas including Amaryllis, premiered in Toulouse in 1906, Le Sortilège, in Paris in 1913 and La Bataille, in Paris in 1931. He also authored music for the ballet L'Aragonaise. Besides, he composed a Prélude et fugue pour grand orchestre as well as several lieder and film scores.

External links 

French opera composers
Male opera composers
French male classical composers
French film score composers
Prix de Rome for composition
Conservatoire de Paris alumni
Musicians from Paris
1885 births
1966 deaths
20th-century classical composers
French male film score composers
20th-century French composers
20th-century French male musicians